"Shadowplay" is a song by the English rock band Joy Division. The song appeared on their 1979 debut album Unknown Pleasures.

Lyrics
Early recordings of the lyrics on the Warsaw album show the first line of the song as saying "To the centre of the city where all roads meet looking for you". In later recordings the word looking is replaced with waiting.

The Killers version

The Killers recorded a version of "Shadowplay" for the 2007 film Control; this version plays during the film's credits and was included on the soundtrack album. The song became a live staple for the band's 2006-2007 Sam's Town Tour.

The band's recording of "Shadowplay" was also included on the group's b-sides and rarities album, Sawdust. Rolling Stone magazine said the recording "should have stayed in the vaults". In April 2013, the Killers were joined onstage by Joy Division and New Order guitarist Bernard Sumner for the first time to perform this song live at Festival Estéreo Picnic in Bogotá, Colombia. They did so once again at their 2013 Lollapalooza appearance.

The Killers version of "Shadowplay" was released as a digital download single on 9 October 2007 and peaked at #68 on the Billboard Hot 100. A music video, directed by Spencer Kaplan and Jonathan V. Sela, was released on 21 November 2007, featuring the band interspersed with clips from Control.

Charts

References

Joy Division songs
The Killers songs
Silversun Pickups songs
2007 singles
Songs written by Bernard Sumner
Songs written by Peter Hook
Songs written by Stephen Morris (musician)
Songs written by Ian Curtis
Black-and-white music videos
1979 songs
Vertigo Records singles
Song recordings produced by Martin Hannett